Douglas Dollarhide (March 11, 1923 – June 28, 2008) was an American politician, notable for serving as the first African American mayor of Compton, California.

Biography

Douglas F. Dollarhide witnessed first hand the transformation of Compton, California from a predominantly white Los Angeles suburb into one of the most heavily concentrated African American communities in the United States. He was elected to the City Council in 1963, becoming its first African American member.

In 1969, Dollarhide made history again, when he became the first black mayor of Compton. After his election crime rose and property values declined throughout Compton. He was defeated for reelection in 1973.

Compton's Dollarhide Neighborhood Center is named after him.

Dollarhide died on June 28, 2008, aged 85, at his home in Northridge in the San Fernando Valley.

See also
List of first African-American mayors

References

External links
African Americans in California
Dollarhide Neighborhood Center (info)

1923 births
2008 deaths
African-American mayors in California
Mayors of Compton, California
20th-century American politicians
20th-century African-American politicians
African-American men in politics
21st-century African-American people